The following is a list of DePaul Blue Demons men's basketball head coaches. There have been 14 head coaches of the Blue Demons in their 100-season history.

DePaul's current head coach is Tony Stubblefield. He was hired as the Blue Demons' head coach in April 2021, replacing Dave Leitao, who was fired after the 2020–21 season.

References

DePaul

DePaul Blue Demons men's basketball coaches